The Vancouver International Film Festival Award for Best Canadian Film is an annual award, presented by the Vancouver International Film Festival to honour the film selected by a jury as the best Canadian film screened at VIFF that year.

The award was presented for the first time in 2003. It was initially open only to films from Western Canada, but was expanded in 2009 to include all Canadian films.

Winners

See also
Toronto International Film Festival Award for Best Canadian Film

References

Best Canadian Film
Awards established in 2003